RSS First Step (Reusable Space Ship First Step) is a New Shepard space capsule, built and operated by American spaceflight company Blue Origin. It is the third New Shepard capsule to fly to space, and the first to fly passengers.

History 

RSS First Step is the third New Shepard capsule built by Blue Origin, and the first designed to carry passengers. It flew to space for the first time on 14 January 2021, during the NS-14 spaceflight. NS-14 also served as the maiden flight of the NS4 propulsion module. The following flight, NS-15, which was also flown uncrewed by First Step and NS4, tested boarding and deboarding in what Blue Origin called an "astronaut operational exercise."

First Step flew Blue Origin's first crewed flight on 20 July 2021, carrying founder Jeff Bezos and three passengers to space. This made Texas the fourth state to launch humans into space, after Florida, California, and New Mexico. As of November 2022, it has flown five subsequent crewed spaceflights, carrying a total of 31 people into space, including one (Evan Dick) twice.

The New Shepard fleet is grounded as of 2022 due to a failure during the NS-23 mission. The capsule used during the mission, RSS H.G. Wells, managed to abort successfully, while the booster was destroyed. The next mission will occur following an investigation.

Flights

References 

Individual space vehicles
Crewed spacecraft
Blue Origin
New Shepard